Lahiru Milantha (born 28 May 1994) is a Sri Lankan cricketer who plays for Ragama Cricket Club. In March 2018, he was the leading run-scorer in the 2017–18 Premier Limited Overs Tournament, with 448 runs from six matches.

In March 2018, he was named in Galle's squad for the 2017–18 Super Four Provincial Tournament. The following month, he was also named in Galle's squad for the 2018 Super Provincial One Day Tournament.

In August 2018, he was named in Galle's squad the 2018 SLC T20 League. In February 2019, Sri Lanka Cricket named him as the Best Batsman in the 2017–18 Premier Limited Overs Tournament. In February 2020, he scored a double century in the 2019–20 Premier League Tournament, making 252 runs for Badureliya Sports Club.

References

External links
 

1994 births
Living people
Sri Lankan cricketers
Badureliya Sports Club cricketers
Galle Guardians cricketers
Prime Doleshwar Sporting Club cricketers
Ragama Cricket Club cricketers
People from Kalutara
Wicket-keepers